Joan Chen (born April 26, 1961) is a Chinese-American actress and film director.  In China, she performed in the 1979 film  and came to the attention of American audiences for her performance in the 1987 film The Last Emperor.  She is also known for her roles in Twin Peaks, Red Rose White Rose, Saving Face, and The Home Song Stories, and for directing the feature film Xiu Xiu: The Sent Down Girl.

Early life
Chen was born in Shanghai, to a family of pharmacologists. She and her older brother, Chase, were raised during the Cultural Revolution. At the age of 14, Chen was discovered on the school rifle range by Jiang Qing, the wife of leader Mao Zedong and major Chinese Communist Party figure, for excelling at marksmanship. This led to her being selected for the Actors' Training Program by the Shanghai Film Studio in 1975, where she was discovered by veteran director Xie Jin who chose her to star in his 1977 film  as a deaf mute whose senses are restored by an army medical team. Chen graduated from high school a year in advance, and at the age of 17 entered Shanghai International Studies University, where she majored in English.

Career

Early career in China

Chen performed alongside Tang Guoqiang in Zhang Zheng's  in 1979, for which she won the Hundred Flowers Award for Best Actress. Chen portrayed a pre-Maoist revolutionary's daughter, who, reunited with her brother, a wounded Communist soldier, later learned that his doctor was her biological mother. Little Flower was her second film and she soon achieved the status of China's most-loved actress; she was dubbed "the Elizabeth Taylor of China" by Time magazine for having achieved stardom while still a teenager.

In addition, Chen was in the 1979 film . The film directed by Ou Fan and Xing Jitian depicts an overseas Chinese family that returns to China from Southeast Asia out of their patriotic feelings but encounter political troubles during the Cultural Revolution. The songs, "I Love You, China" and "High Flies the Petrel", sung by Chen's character, are perennial favorites in China.

Hollywood breakout
At age 20, Chen moved to the United States, where she studied filmmaking at California State University, Northridge.

Her first Hollywood movie was Tai-Pan, filmed on location in China. In 1985 she appeared in the U.S. television show Miami Vice as May Ying, former wife of Martin Castillo and husband to Ma Sek in the episode "Golden Triangle (Part II)". She went on to star in Bernardo Bertolucci's The Last Emperor in 1987 and the David Lynch/Mark Frost television series Twin Peaks as Josie Packard. She starred alongside Rutger Hauer in 1989's The Blood of Heroes, written and directed by David Webb Peoples. In 1993 she co-starred in Oliver Stone's Heaven & Earth. She portrayed two different characters in Clara Law's Temptation of a Monk: a seductive princess of Tang dynasty, and a dangerous temptress. She shaved her head on-screen for the role. The award-winning film was adapted from a novel by Lilian Lee.

In 1994 she co-starred with Steven Seagal in the action-adventure On Deadly Ground; she returned to Shanghai to star in Stanley Kwan's Red Rose White Rose opposite Winston Chao, and subsequently won a Golden Horse Award and a Hong Kong Film Critics Society Award for her performance. In 1996, she was a member of the jury at the 46th Berlin International Film Festival.

Tired of being cast as an exotic beauty in Hollywood films, Chen moved into directing in 1998 with the critically acclaimed Xiu Xiu: The Sent Down Girl, adapted from the novella Celestial Bath by her friend Yan Geling. She later directed Autumn in New York, starring Richard Gere and Winona Ryder, in 2000.

Later career
In the middle of the 2000s, Chen made a comeback in acting and began to work intensely, alternating between English and Chinese-language roles.

In 2004, she starred in Hou Yong's family saga Jasmine Women, alongside Zhang Ziyi, in which they played multiple roles as daughters and mothers across three generations in Shanghai. She also starred in the Asian-American comedy Saving Face as a widowed mother, who is shunned by the Chinese-American community for being pregnant and unwed and has come to live with her lesbian daughter.

In 2005, she appeared in Zhang Yang's family saga Sunflower, as a mother whose husband and son have a troubled father-son relationship over 30 years. She starred in the Asian American independent film Americanese and in Michael Almereyda's Tonight at Noon, the first part of a two part project, scheduled to be released in 2009.

In 2007, Chen was acclaimed for her performance in Tony Ayres' drama The Home Song Stories. She portrayed a glamorous and unstable Chinese nightclub singer who struggles to survive in 1970s Australia with her two children. The role earned her four awards including the Australian Film Institute Award for Best Actress and the Golden Horse Award for Best Actress. The same year saw her co-starring in two other acclaimed films: Ang Lee's Lust, Caution, opposite Tony Leung Chiu-Wai, and Jiang Wen's The Sun Also Rises, opposite Anthony Wong Chau-Sang, for which she received an Asian Film Award for Best Supporting Actress.

In 2008, she starred alongside Sam Chow in Shi Qi, directed by Joe Chow, as a rural mother of a 17-year-old in eastern Zhejiang province. The same year Joan Chen portrayed a factory worker in Jia Zhangke's 24 City once fancied because she resembled Chen herself in the 1979 film Little Flower, but who missed her chance at love.

She co-starred in Bruce Beresford's 2009 adaptation of the autobiography of dancer Li Cunxin, Mao's Last Dancer, along with Wang Shuangbao and Kyle MacLachlan.

She also played the part of goddess Guan Yin in the 2010 Chinese TV adaptation of Journey to the West, directed by Cheng Lidong.

In October 2009 Joan Chen was the curator of the first Singapore Sun Film Festival, whose theme was "The Art of Living Well". She selected and curated five films for screening during the festival: The Diving Bell and the Butterfly, Dead Man Walking, Hannah and Her Sisters, Still Life and Edward Scissorhands.

In 2010, Chen joined the cast of Leehom Wang's directorial debut Love in Disguise, Alexi Tan's Color Me Love (alongside Liu Ye), Ilkka Järvi-Laturi's Kiss, His First (alongside Tony Leung Ka-fai and Gwei Lun-mei) and veteran acting coach Larry Moss' Relative Insanity (along with Juliette Binoche). In May 2010, she was set to star and direct one of the three parts of the anthology film Seeing Red.

In 2011, she played Secretary Bishop's girlfriend on the television series Fringe episode "Immortality". Chen was cast as the Mongol Yuan Dynasty empress Chabi in the 2014 American television series Marco Polo. Being somewhat unfamiliar with the Mongols, Chen read The Secret History of the Mongol Queens in order to prepare for the role.  She also appeared in several episodes of the 2018 Chinese television drama Ruyi's Royal Love in the Palace as Ula Nara Yixiu  (the Empress Xiaojingxian).

Personal life
Chen was formerly married to actor Jim "Jimmy" Lau from 1985 to 1990. Chen married her second husband, cardiologist Peter Hui, on January 18, 1992. They have two daughters. They live in San Francisco, California.

During her early years in California, Chen attended California State University, Northridge. In 1989, she became a naturalized citizen of the United States. On April 9, 2008, Chen wrote an article entitled "Let the Games Go On" for the Washington Post objecting to the politicization of the 2008 Summer Olympics in Beijing.

Charitable work
In May 2008, Chen appeared alongside James Kyson Lee, Silas Flensted, and Amy Hanaialiʻi Gilliom in a public service announcement for the Banyan Tree Project campaign to stop HIV/AIDS-related stigma in Asian & Pacific Islander communities.

In October 2008, Chen made the cover of Trends Health magazine alongside actresses Ke Lan and Ma Yili to promote the Chinese Pink Ribbon Breast Cancer Prevention campaign.

On January 8, 2010, Chen attended, alongside Nancy Pelosi, Nicole Kidman, and Joe Torre, the ceremony to help Family Violence Prevention Fund break ground on a new center located in the Presidio of San Francisco intended to combat violence against women and children. During the ceremony, Chen performed an excerpt from the documentary play The Thumbprint of Mukhtar Mai (presented as part of "Seven").

On January 15, 2010, Chen was set to appear, along with other Asian American personalities, in a series of videos supporting the Center for the Pacific Asian Family.

Filmography

Actress

Director

Writer

Producer

Other media
2008: "Shanghai," narrator—an audio walking tour by Louis Vuitton and Soundwalk

Awards and nominations

Other recognition
 In 1992 People magazine chose her as one of the 50 most beautiful women in the world.
 Chen inspired indie rock band Xiu Xiu, named after her film Xiu Xiu: The Sent Down Girl.
 Chen was chosen by Goldsea as Number 45 on its compilation of "The 120 Most Inspiring Asian Americans of All Time".

References

Articles and interviews
 "The Last Empress", by C. Mark Jacobson. Interview. December 1987. p. 146-147.
 "In Praise of Actors: Joan Chen", by Peter Rainer. American Film. Volume 15: Issue 8. May 1990. p. 32.
 "Heavenly And Hearthy", by Tom Kagy. Goldsea Asian American Daily. August 1992.
 "Chen Reaction", by Alison Dakota Gee. Movieline (USA). December 1993. p. 54-59, 88.
 "West To East", by Richard Corliss. TIME (USA). Volume 153: Issue 13. April 5, 1999.
 "Joan of Art", by Richard Corliss. TIME (USA). April 5, 1999.
 "The Sent Down Girl", by Steven Schwankert. Beijing Scene. Volume 5: Issue 8. May 7, 1999.
 "Joan Chen: Guerilla Director", by Michael Sragow. Salon.com. May 27, 1999.
 "Reel Poetry", by Kevin Berger. San Francisco (USA). July 2000. p. 51.
 "Joan Chen: Whether it's China or Hollywood, this actress/director tells it like it is", by Franz Lidz. Interview. August 2000. p. 80-81.
 "An Interview with Joan Chen", by Michelle Caswell. Asia Source. November 2000.
 "Is Joan Chen Done with Hollywood?" Goldsea Asian American Daily. January 28, 2003.
 "Empress and Enigma". China Daily. October 25, 2003.
 "Joan Chen's Wild Side", by Malinda Lo. Curve. Volume 15: Issue 4. June 2005.
 "The Face Behind Saving Face", by Kenny Tanemura. Asian Week. June 3, 2005.
 "Sensuously Elegant: An Interview with Joan Chen", by Lisa Odham Stokes. Asian Cult Cinema (USA). Issue 48. October–December 2005. p. 51-61.
 "Joan Chen on Filming Lust, Caution in Shanghai: Follow One's Heart.", by Liu Qing. The Chinese Mirror. February 28, 2007.
 "The Many Faces of Joan Chen.", by Glen Schaefer. The Province. October 3, 2007.
 "Joan Chen returns to Chinese film.", by Min Lee. The China Post. October 17, 2007.

External links

 
  Joan Chen at the Chinese Movie Database
 Joan Chen at Yahoo! Movies
 Joan Chen at Allmovie
 Joan Chen at Art and Culture
 Joan Chen profile at EmanuelLevy.com

1961 births
Living people
20th-century Chinese actresses
20th-century American actresses
21st-century Chinese actresses
21st-century American actresses
American actresses of Chinese descent
American film actresses
American film actors of Asian descent
American film directors
American film directors of Chinese descent
American television actresses
American women film directors
American writers of Chinese descent
California State University, Northridge alumni
Chinese emigrants to the United States
Chinese women film directors
Chinese film actresses
Film directors from Shanghai
Members of Committee of 100
Chinese television actresses
Screenwriters from Shanghai
Actresses from Shanghai
Naturalized citizens of the United States
Screenwriters from California
Best Actress AACTA Award winners
Best Supporting Actress Asian Film Award winners